Jon is a shortened form of the common given name Jonathan, derived from "YHWH has given", and an alternate spelling of John, derived from "YHWH has pardoned".

The name is spelled Jón in Iceland and on the Faroe Islands. In the Nordic countries, it is derived from Johannes.

Notable people
 
Jon Adkins (born 1977), American baseball player
Jon Anderson (born 1944 as John Roy Anderson), English musician and singer, with Yes
Jon Batiste (born 1986), American musician
H. Jon Benjamin (born 1966, whose first given name is Harry), American actor, comedian, and producer
Jon Bellion, American singer-songwriter and rapper
Jon Bon Jovi, professional name of John Francis Bongiovi Jr. (born 1962), American singer, songwriter, guitarist, and actor, founder and frontman of the rock band Bon Jovi
Jon Culshaw, English comedian and impressionist
Jon Davison, American singer-songwriter and musician (Yes)
Jon Edwards (born 1988), American baseball player
Jon Favreau (born 1966), American film director and producer
Jon Garland (born 1979), American baseball player
Jon Glaser, American actor, producer, comedian, and writer
Jon Gray (born 1991), American baseball player
Jon Gruden (born 1963), American football coach
Jon Hamm (born 1971), American actor
Jon Heder (born 1977), American actor
Jon-Erik Hexum (1957-1984), American actor and model
Jon Jay (born 1985), American baseball player
Jon Kaplan, multiple people
Jon Kitna (born 1972), American football player
Jon Kyl (born 1942). United States Senator
Jon Landau, American music critic and record producer, associated with Bruce Springsteen
Jon Lee, multiple people 
Jon Leicester (born 1979), American baseball player
Jon Lester (born 1984), American baseball player
Jon Lieber (born 1970), American baseball player
Jon Lord (1941–2012), Hammond organist for Deep Purple
Jon Matlack (born 1950), American baseball player
Jon Meloan (born 1984), American baseball player
Jon Miller (born 1951), American sports announcer
Jon Moscot (born 1991), American baseball player
Jon Moxley (born 1985), American professional wrestler
Jon Niese (born 1986), American baseball player
Jon Nunnally (born 1971), American baseball player
Jon Pareles, American journalist and music critic
Jon Peters, American film producer
Jon Polito (died 2016), American actor
Jon Jon Poulos (1947–1980), American drummer for The Buckinghams
Jon Rauch (born 1978), American baseball player
Jon Robinson (disambiguation), multiple people
Jon Runyan Sr. (born 1973), American football player and politician
Jon Runyan Jr. (born 1997), American football player
Jon Ryan (born 1981), Canadian gridiron football player
Jon Singleton, multiple people
Jon Snow, multiple people 
Jon Stevens (born 1961), New Zealand singer
Jon Stewart, multiple people
Jon Stewart (born 1962), American comedian
Jon Taffer (born 1954). American entrepreneur and television personality (Bar Rescue)
Jon Thorbjörnson (born 1976), Swedish politician
JonTron, pseudonym of American Internet personality Jonathan Jafari
Jon Voight (born 1938), American actor
Jon Venables (born 1982), british murderer
Jon Warden (born 1946), American baseball player
The Jon, alias of Jonathan Sprague, former member of Steam Powered Giraffe

Fictional characters
Jon, in the animated comedy series Eddsworld
Jon Arbuckle, Garfield's owner
Jon Cassidy, a dinoboy from Dino Ranch
Jon Snow (character), a character in A Song of Ice and Fire book series and its television adaptation Game of Thrones
Jon Irenicus, the main villain in the role-playing video game Baldur's Gate II: Shadows of Amn

See also
John (given name)
Jonathan (name)
Jón
Jon (Albanian name)
Jon (disambiguation)

References

Masculine given names
English masculine given names